Christopher Todd Dillard Owens (born December 1, 1986) is a former American football cornerback. He was drafted by the Atlanta Falcons in the third round of the 2009 NFL Draft. He played college football at San Jose State.

Early years
Born in Los Angeles, California, Owens attended Susan Miller Dorsey High School in Los Angeles. Owens, in his senior season, had five interceptions and was named first-team all-league. Owens graduated from Dorsey High in 2004.

College career
Part of Fitz Hill's final recruiting class, Owens attended San Jose State University, the only school that offered him an athletic scholarship. Owens redshirted his freshman year and first played in 2005, under new head coach Dick Tomey. In 11 games played as a freshman, Owens had 35 tackles, 2 interceptions, 6 passes defended, and a forced fumble. As a sophomore in 2006, Owens led San Jose State to the 2006 New Mexico Bowl title and played 13 games (starting all 13) with 50 tackles, 4 interceptions, and 9 passes defended.

As a junior in 2007, Owens was selected All-WAC second-team and led the conference with six interceptions; he also had 75 tackles and 9 passes defended. In his senior season of 2008, Owens had 68 tackles, one interception, 9 passes defended, and 2 forced fumbles.

Professional career

Atlanta Falcons 
In the 2009 NFL Draft, the Atlanta Falcons selected Owens in the third round, 90th overall. As a rookie, Owens played 16 games with 6 starts. He had 29 tackles, 2 passes defended, and 2 interceptions.

In 2010, Owens again played in 16 games and had 3 starts. He had 40 tackles, 1 pass defended, and 3 interceptions. In the Falcons' Divisional Round loss to eventual Super Bowl XLV champions Green Bay Packers, Owens had 7 tackles, a pass defended, and a quarterback hit.

In 2011, Owens played 14 games with 2 starts. He had 27 tackles, a sack, 3 passes defended, a quarterback hit, 2 tackles for loss, and 8 special teams tackles.

In 2012, Owens played in 13 games with one start. In the regular season, Owens had 17 tackles, 4 passes defended, one tackle for loss, one forced fumble, and 5 special teams tackles. In the postseason, Owens played in the NFC Championship Game, a 28-24 loss to the San Francisco 49ers. Owens had one tackle, on special teams.

Cleveland Browns 
Owens signed with the Cleveland Browns in 2013. He played 12 games with 2 starts and had 51 tackles, 2.5 sacks (for a total loss of 13.5 yards), 3 passes defended, 2 quarterback hits, a tackle for loss, a fumble recovery, a forced fumble, and six special teams tackles. On December 17, the Browns waived Owens.

Miami Dolphins 
The following day, Owens signed with the Miami Dolphins. Owens played in the Dolphins' season finale, a 20-7 loss to the New York Jets, and had a tackle on special teams.

Kansas City Chiefs 
On March 21, 2014, Owens signed with the Kansas City Chiefs. In the 2014 season, Owens played 11 games with 3 starts for the Chiefs and had 33 tackles with 4 passes defended.

Detroit Lions 
On May 13, 2015, the Detroit Lions signed Owens to a one-year contract. On August 31, 2015, the Lions placed Owens on IR.

New Orleans Saints 
On November 25, 2015 Owens signed with the New Orleans Saints.

Personal life
Owens is a member of Phi Beta Sigma fraternity, joining the Mu Lambda chapter at San Jose State in 2006.  Owens's brother Alvin played for the San Diego Riptide of AF2, and Owens's cousin Bené Benwikere also played cornerback at San Jose State and was drafted in 2014 by the Carolina Panthers.

References

External links
San José State Spartans bio

1986 births
Living people
Players of American football from Los Angeles
American football cornerbacks
San Jose State Spartans football players
Atlanta Falcons players
Cleveland Browns players
Miami Dolphins players
Kansas City Chiefs players
Detroit Lions players
New Orleans Saints players
Susan Miller Dorsey High School alumni